The De Schaum was an American automobile manufactured in Buffalo, New York from 1908 to 1909.  The company offered a 7 hp High wheeler called  the De Shaum and Seven Little Buffaloes.

History 
William A. De Shaum was William A Shaum with a new name.  After building the Shaum automobile in Baltimore, he arrived in Buffalo in 1906 and built a high wheeler for C. Rossler Manufacturing Company. 

In 1908 he formed the De Shaum Motor Syndicate Company and began building a high-wheeler under his own name. High-wheeler sales were on the decline and for 1909 he renamed the De Shaum as the Seven Little Buffaloes.

De Shaum was out of business before the end of the year and began a new venture in Hornell, New York in 1910.  No cars were ever produced in Hornell and he left for Michigan where he formed a new De Shaum Motor Car Company and the Suburban Motor Car Company.

External links 

 The Con Man Who Started It All, W. A. Schaum

References

Defunct motor vehicle manufacturers of the United States
Motor vehicle manufacturers based in New York (state)
Defunct companies based in New York (state)
Highwheeler
Brass Era vehicles
1900s cars
Vehicle manufacturing companies established in 1908
Vehicle manufacturing companies disestablished in 1909
Cars introduced in 1908